Jim Egan may refer to:
 Jim Egan (baseball) (1858–1884), American baseball player
 Jim Egan (activist) (1921–2000), Canadian LGBT rights activist

See also
 James Egan (disambiguation)